The Yogo Island is an island on Lake Chad in Chad.

References

Lake Chad
Lake islands of Africa
Geography of Chad